Marshall W. Taylor may refer to:

Marshall Walter Taylor, (1878–1932), US cyclist 
 Rev. Marshall W. Taylor (minister), author of "Plantation Melodies, Book of Negro Folk Songs", published in 1882